Jack Carkeek, (January 22, 1861 – March 12, 1924) was an American Cornish champion wrestler, from Rockland, Michigan. His parents were from Cornwall. He died March 12, 1924, in Havana, Cuba.

He made his first appearance at Michigamme, Michigan, on July 5, 1877, at age 16. There, he won the fourth prize in a tournament of 64 entries. Jack Carkeek and John Pearce (the Cornish champion from Cornwall for five years) met for the World Championship of Cornish Wrestling in Redruth, Cornwall.

Wrestling career
Up until 1882, he wrestled just in Michigan, and then afterwards in Wisconsin, Iowa, Montana. At the beginning, he wrestled only in ordinary tournaments, with a dozen or so other wrestlers, while later only wrestling in challenge matches for side money.
1884
 March 4, defeated Nels Stone at Peterson, Iowa, for $100 each
 September, defeated William Harrison, at Kinsley, Iowa
 December 10, Carkeek defeated James Pascoe, the champion Cornish wrestler of the Pacific Coast, for a purse of $500, in Butte, Montana.

1885
 January 1, defeated Sam Snell in the Cornish style for $100
 January 10, Carkeek defeated D A McMillan of Bodie, California, in a mixed match of five styles, for $250 a side at Butte City.
 February 28, he defeated H C Bell in Darlington, Wisconsin, for $500 a side, in the Cornish style.
 April 26, in San Francisco, California, Carkeek was defeated by Tom Cannon, the great champion, in mixed matches consisting of six styles.
 June 20, he defeated O H Ingraham in Antioch, California, in the "catch-as-catch-can" style for $100 a side.
 July 4, he won first prize in a tournament against 34 competitors at Grass Valley, California.
 November 25, beat J D Cudihee of Leadville, Colorado for $250 a side.

1886
 February 6, at Leadville, he defeated R Holcombe of Grass Valley, California in collar and elbow for $100 a side.
 July 14, in Dodgeville, Wisconsin, Carkeek wrestled Sorakichi Matsuda, from Japan, for $500 a side (in both Greco-Roman wrestling and catch-as-catch-can wrestling) and won in 54 minutes.
 July 29, defeated Sorakichi Matsuda, a second time for $250 a side in Milwaukee.
 August 21, beat Ben Roddle in catch-as-catch-can for $250 at Sioux Falls, South Dakota
 November 7, at Ishpenning, Michigan, beat J Stephens in Cornish wrestling for the gate receipts.
 December 1, defeated Pat McHugh in catch-as-catch-can at Iron Mountain.
 December 20, defeated Joe Trudell in Cornish wrestling.

1887
 January 2, at Hurley, Wisconsin beat J P Donnor in catch-as-catch-can for $100 a side.
 January 12, wrestled J P Donnor, agreeing to throw him five times in an hour, but lost having thrown him four times.
 May 9, defeated Bert Schiller at catch-as-catch-can in Milwaukee.
 4 July, fought John Pearce of Wendron, Cornwall, at the Recreation Ground, Redruth, Cornwall for £100 a side. The result is disputed as to whether Carkeek won or the match was a draw. On 8 July, they quarrelled in Redruth with Carkeek biting Pearce's ear and Carkeek cut on the face by a broken glass.

 1 August, wrestling match for 'the championship of the world' at Redruth Recreation Ground against Hancock. The result was two falls each and no result. Many of the crowd entered the ring accusing the wrestlers of ″faggoting″, i.e. match fixing.

Championships and accomplishments
Catch wrestling
American Catch-as-Catch-Can Championship (1 time)
European Catch-as-Catch-Can Championship (1 time)
World Catch-as-Catch-Can Championship (1 time)
Cornish wrestling
World Cornish wrestling champion: 1886
World Cornish wrestling champion: 1887
American Cornish wrestling champion: 1887
World Cornish wrestling champion: 1889
World Cornish wrestling champion: 1901 
World Cornish wrestling champion: 1904
World Cornish wrestling champion: 1905

Arrest for match fixing
Carkeek was a member of a swindling crew known as the Mabray gang. In 1910, he was arrested for participation in the fixing of wrestling matches. Carkeek spent two years in prison before the case was ultimately dismissed.

References

1861 births
1924 deaths
American catch wrestlers
American male professional wrestlers
American male sport wrestlers
American people of Cornish descent
Cornish wrestling champions
People from Ontonagon County, Michigan